Menazel Sazmani  or Manazel Sazmani may refer to:
 Menazel Sazmani, Bagh-e Malek
 Manazel Sazmani, Lali